Unsolved (originally known as Unsolved: Getting Away with Murder) is a British regional crime documentary television programme produced by Grampian Television (now STV North) that aired in Scotland. The programme aired from 8 January 2004 to 30 November 2006.

Background

The series investigated some of the most baffling and intriguing murders in Northern and Central Scotland, where the killers have never been caught and in some cases, the bodies never found. The series was presented by Taggart star Alex Norton, with series producer and former North Tonight presenter Isla Traquair hosting a special update programme at the end of both series. The programme was produced by STV Productions in Glasgow. The show was created in order to help the police find out more information from the public on unsolved murders. Both series of Unsolved generated a huge public response and in some cases, led to a breakthrough. The show was a contributory factor in police deciding to dig up a quarry as part of the investigation into the murder of Renee MacRae and her son Andrew, and while their bodies were never found, Northern Constabulary filed a report to the procurator fiscal naming the person responsible.

Developments
An hour-long special was aired on 10 December 2008 following the conviction of Peter Tobin for the murder of Vicky Hamilton. It was only because of the police investigation of the murder of Tobin's final victim Angelika Kluk, that led police to trace his history; they discovered that he was living in Bathgate at the time Vicky vanished in 1991. A more significant development that emerged in the years following the series was the possible link between Tobin and Bible John. It was speculated that Tobin was in fact the unidentified man known as Bible John who murdered 3 women in the late 1960s. David Wilson, a professor of criminology at Birmingham University has spearheaded the thesis that both men are the same individual. Wilson states: "I didn't set out to prove Tobin was Bible John but I would stake my professional reputation on it."

Former Black Watch sniper Michael Ross, who was 15 at the time of the crime was sentenced to a minimum of 25 years for the 1994 murder of Shamsuddin Mahmood in 2008. In March 2013, John Docherty was charged with the 1986 murder of Elaine Doyle. In August 2014, he was sentenced to a minimum of 21 years in prison. In January 2013, forensic experts exhumed a grave in a Coatbridge cemetery in the hope of finding the remains of Moira Anderson who vanished in 1957. No remains were found and it looks unlikely that it will ever be solved. However, child sex abuse campaigner Sandra Brown has always maintained that her own father, Alexander Gartshore, a convicted child sex offender and former bus driver who died in 2006, had abducted and killed Moira after she boarded his bus on her way to a nearby Co-op. She said in an interview with the BBC: "My dad was definitely a paedophile – and we're talking about the kind in the same mould as Jimmy Savile."

Episodes

References

External links
 Unsolved: Getting Away with Murder at stv.tv (Archive page)

2000s Scottish television series
2004 Scottish television series debuts
2006 Scottish television series endings
English-language television shows
Scottish television shows
Television shows produced by Grampian Television